Seltsy is a rural locality (a selo) in Rybnovsky District of Ryazan Oblast, Russia, located on the Oka River, north-west of Ryazan. The Polish 1st Tadeusz Kościuszko Infantry Division was formed here in May 1943.

Rural localities in Ryazan Oblast